Michaella Rugwizangoga is a Rwandan engineer with experience in strategic planning, project management and product development. She is currently the CEO of Volkswagen Mobility Solutions Rwanda, making her the first African woman CEO within the group.

References 

Year of birth missing (living people)
Living people
Place of birth missing (living people)
Rwandan engineers
Rwandan chief executives
Women chief executives
Chief executives in the automobile industry
Rwandan women engineers
Volkswagen Group executives